The Integrated Transport Network (ITN) is a dataset containing details of Great Britain's transport network. Produced by Ordnance Survey – the national mapping agency of Great Britain – it forms part of the OS MasterMap suite of products.

Intended to facilitate route planning and resource management, the dataset consists of three elements: Road Network (road geometry), Road Routing Information (routing information for drivers concerning mandatory and banned turns and other restrictions) and Urban Paths (man-made path geometry in urban areas).  

The network is a link-and-node based network containing such details about each link as: 
the class of road (A-road, B-road, etc.); 
the nature of the road (single carriageway, dual carriageway, roundabout, etc.); 
road names; 
road routing information (RRI) (e.g. prohibited turns, one-way streets).
These data are supplied in Geography Markup Language file format.

Features
The main benefits claimed for this product are that
it accurately maps all 545,000 km of roads in Great Britain in a consistent logical link-and-node network; 
it contains 1.7 million road routing and information features; 
all road changes are captured within six months of their implementation; 
the Urban Paths Theme complements ITN's road information by adding path networks in all urban areas; 
it is designed to relate to other OS MasterMap layers.

ITN is used as the roads network by Transport Direct Portal for its car and cycle journey planning; is referenced in the CycleNetXChange schema; and forms a key element in the UK Digital National Framework (DNF).

Future developments
From 31 March 2019 the Integrated Transport Network product will be withdrawn. It is in the process of being replaced by the OS MasterMap Highways Network, launched on 31 October 2016.

References

External links
 OS MasterMap
 DNF
 Transport Direct Portal
 London's integrated public transport 'all-on-one' quickmap

Transport in the United Kingdom